Jo Woo-chan (born January 20, 2005), is a South Korean rapper. He was a contestant on Show Me the Money 6. He released his first collaborative single, "OGZ", on January 5, 2018.

Early life 
Jo was born on January 20, 2005, in Seoul, South Korea. He moved to Perth, Australia when he was 2 and lived there for 14 years occasionally visiting South Korea during school breaks. He studied at Applecross Senior High. 

During his childhood, he was active as an actor and model, also having starred in commercials for various brands.

Career

2017–2020: Show Me the Money 6, OG School Project, departure from Cube 
In 2017, at just 12 years old, Jo Woo-chan became the youngest contestant in the history of Show Me the Money 6 and earned the nickname "Lil Dok2". During the show, he released three collaboration singles, "1/N" with Dynamic Duo, "What You Call Is The Price" featuring Nucksal, and "VVIP" featuring Sik-K. Jo was eliminated in the semi-finals. As a guest, Jo featured on Hui's song "Wake me up"  for KBS's pilot music variety show, Hyena on the Keyboard. The single was released on October 9 on various online Korean music sites. In October 2017, Jo was cast in the JTBC short film Father’s Sword by Director Jeong Yoon-cheol.

On January 5, 2018, Jo took part in a joint project group called OG School Project with Starship trainees Park Hyun-jin and Achillo, they released the song "OGZ", produced by GroovyRoom.

In July 2019, Jo made his departure from Cube Entertainment. In the same month, he released his first digital single album, ID Schoolboy Pt.1. On August 13, Jo released his second digital single album, ID Schoolboy Pt.2.

On May 16, 2020, Jo released his first extended play (EP), ID Schoolboy Pt.3.

January 2022 - December 2022: Trainee A 
On January 8, 2022, Jo was revealed as a member of Big Hit Music's upcoming boy group with the tentative name Trainee A. However, the debut project was later cancelled and Trainee A's all social media channels ended their services on December 23, 2022.

Discography

Extended plays

Singles

Filmography

Films

Variety shows

Notes

References

 

2005 births
Living people
K-pop singers
Hybe Corporation artists
Cube Entertainment artists
South Korean male rappers
South Korean hip hop singers
21st-century South Korean  male singers
Show Me the Money (South Korean TV series) contestants